Michael Edward Fossum (born December 19, 1957, in Sioux Falls, South Dakota) is a former American astronaut, engineer, and the Chief Operating Officer of Texas A&M University at Galveston. He flew into space on board the NASA Space Shuttle missions STS-121 and STS-124 and served as a mission specialist of Expedition 28 and commander of Expedition 29 aboard the International Space Station.

Air Force 
Fossum was involved with the United States Air Force during his undergraduate years at Texas A&M and served as commander of Squadron 3 in the Corps of Cadets. He graduated in mechanical engineering in 1980. He received his master's in physical science (space science) from the University of Houston. He was selected to attend Air Force Test Pilot School from which he flew 34 different types of aircraft.
. He left active duty for the Air Force Reserve in 1992 to work for NASA and retired as a colonel in the USAFR in 2010.

NASA 
The first time Fossum became interested in being an astronaut was at age 12 while watching the Apollo 11 moon landing.  He rekindled this dream while with the Air Force at Johnson Space Center during the early 1990s.

In January 1993, Fossum was employed by NASA as a Systems Engineer. His primary responsibilities were to evaluate the Russian Soyuz spacecraft for use as an emergency escape vehicle for the new International Space Station. Later in 1993, Fossum was selected to represent the Flight Crew Operations Directorate in an extensive redesign of the International Space Station (ISS). After this, he continued work for the crew office and Mission Operations Directorate in the area of assembly operations. In 1996, Fossum supported the Astronaut Office as a Technical Assistant for Space Shuttle, supporting design and management reviews. In 1997, he served as a Flight Test Engineer on the X-38, a prototype crew escape vehicle for the ISS, which was under development in house by the Engineering Directorate at NASA-JSC and flight tested at NASA Dryden.

Fossum was selected by NASA as an astronaut candidate in June 1998, having applied during almost every selection period since 1988 (7 times). He reported for training in August 1998. Fossum previously served as the Astronaut Office Lead for ISS flight software development. As a Capsule Communicator (CAPCOM) in Mission Control, Fossum supported several flights, including Lead CAPCOM for ISS Expedition 6. A veteran of three space flights, STS-121 in 2006, STS-124 in 2008 and Expedition 28/29 in 2011, Fossum has logged more than 194 days in space, including more than 48 hours of Extravehicular Activity (EVA) in seven spacewalks.

After returning to Earth in 2011, Fossum has served in a number of capacities, including assistant to the chief of the astronaut office for the International Space Station.

Space flight

He entered space for the first time on July 4, 2006, as a mission specialist of mission STS-121 to the International Space Station where he participated in three spacewalks. On July 8, Fossum with Piers Sellers conducted a 7 and a half hour spacewalk making a repair to the ISS and testing using the Shuttle's arm as a platform for making repairs to the Shuttle. Fossum became the first Texas A&M undergraduate to travel to space.

In 2008, Fossum assumed the role of mission specialist on board STS-124 launching on May 31, 2008. The mission's primary objective was the delivery and installment of Japan's Kibo Laboratory module. Once attached, this module became the largest and most scientifically capable addition to the International Space Station. Fossum took part in the installation as lead spacewalker, EVA-1, accompanied by fellow spacewalker Ron Garan. They would ultimately performed three spacewalks during the 14-day mission.

On June 7, 2011, Fossum launched with crewmates Sergey Alexandrovich Volkov and Satoshi Furukawa on Soyuz TMA-02M from the Baikonur Cosmodrome, Kazakhstan, to the ISS to join the crew of Expedition 28. Upon the departure of Expedition 28, Fossum served as ISS commander during Expedition 29 from September 9 until November 21, 2011. He returned to Earth on November 22, 2011.
During Expedition 28, Fossum performed his seventh EVA with Ronald Garan which lasted 6 hours and 31 minutes. During the EVA They retrieved a failed pump module for return to Earth, installed two experiments and repaired a new base for the Canada Arm 2.

Texas A&M University at Galveston 
In January 2017, Fossum left NASA and accepted a position with Texas A&M University at Galveston as vice president and chief operating officer. In October of 2019, Colonel Fossum was appointed as Superintendent of Texas A&M Maritime Academy; Texas A&M at Galveston's chapter of the institution's famed corps of cadets; in addition to his aforementioned duties at Texas A&M at Galveston.

Personal 

Fossum is married to the former Melanie J. London and they have four children together.  In his spare time he enjoys activities with his family and pastimes such as jogging and backpacking.

As an Eagle Scout, he is heavily involved with the Boy Scouts of America (BSA) as well as the Order of the Arrow and is the Scoutmaster of Troop 1598 based in Webster, TX. The BSA has honored him with its Distinguished Eagle Scout Award. On May 30, 2007, Fossum was invited to be the keynote speaker at the opening ceremony at Philmont Scout Ranch, starting off the ranch's 2007 season by relating to the staff there how his experiences both in scouting and at Philmontn helped him overcome many challenges in his life.

He still keeps a close affiliation with Texas A&M University and the university's Corps of Cadets, from which he graduated in 1980. Since returning from his first mission in 2006, he has been involved in many different Texas A&M speaking events, including Elephant Walk, Aggie Muster, JCAP (Corps of Cadets), and the presentation of an Aggie flag flown on STS-121 at a Texas A&M football game. On March 6, 2010, Fossum became the youngest person inducted into the Corps of Cadets Hall of Honor. In 2011, NASA worked with the Texas A&M School of Engineering to host a live interview from the ISS between Fossum and Aggie students.

A junior high school in McAllen, Texas, has been named after Fossum.

Fossum resides in Houston, Texas.

Awards and decorations

References

External links

 Interview
 
Spacefacts biography of Michael E. Fossum
 The STS-121 Mission

1957 births
Air Force Institute of Technology alumni
U.S. Air Force Test Pilot School alumni
Living people
People from Sioux Falls, South Dakota
Systems engineers
Texas A&M University alumni
University of Houston–Clear Lake alumni
Commanders of the International Space Station
United States Air Force officers
United States Air Force reservists
NASA civilian astronauts
American people of Norwegian descent
Space Shuttle program astronauts
Recipients of the NASA Distinguished Service Medal
Spacewalkers